Henry Grady Weaver (December 24, 1889 – January 3, 1949) was the director of Customer Research Staff for General Motors Corporation, and shown on the cover of the November 14, 1938 issue of Time Magazine. He is credited with developing the use of the survey questionnaire to investigate customer preferences for design features in cars.

Early life and education
He was named after, but not related to, Henry Woodfin Grady who died the day before Weaver was born. He was nicknamed Buck Weaver after the baseball player of the same name who later was part of the 1919 Black Sox scandal.  He was born in Eatonton, Georgia and obtained his Bachelor of Science from Georgia Tech in 1911.

Career
Blind in his right eye since birth, he worked as a mechanic, salesman and draftsman before becoming director of Customer Research Staff of General Motors Corporation. It was for that work that he was placed on the cover of the November 14, 1938 issue of Time.

He is best known for his work, The Mainspring of Human Progress.

References

External links
 The Mainspring of Human Progress

1889 births
1949 deaths
Writers from Georgia (U.S. state)
Georgia Tech alumni
General Motors former executives
People from Eatonton, Georgia
Market researchers
American libertarians